This is a complete list of all players who won the Davis Cup, an international team event in men's tennis:

References

winning players
Davis Cup